On da Grind is the fourth studio album by Ghetto Mafia. It was released on October 20, 1998, as the group's second and final album through Fully Loaded Records. The production handled by the Ghetto Mafia and Carl "Cooly C" Dorsey. On da Grind became the group's most successful album, peaking at 169 on the Billboard 200, their only album to make it to that chart. The single, "In Decatur", managed to make it to the Hot R&B/Hip-Hop singles chart.

Track listing
"For 99"- :19  
"Ghetto Mafia"- 3:59  
"In Decatur"- 4:19  
"On da Grind"- 4:27  
"Down Goes His Beeper"- 4:40  
"Chaos"- :27  
"F.T.K."- 4:16  
"Dot My Doe"- 4:27  
"P.A.N."- 4:20  
"Da Chase"- :18  
"Boyz in Blue"- 4:47  
"Cell Block G"- 4:15  
"On da Grind" (Remix)- 5:39  
"Goin Out with This Gauge"- 4:01  
"High as Hell"- 3:54

Charts

On da Grind

In Decatur

References

External links
On da Grind at Discogs
[ On da Grind] at Billboard

1998 albums
Ghetto Mafia albums